Gauhati Town Club is an Indian multi sports club based in Guwahati, Assam. Founded in 1906, the club had participated in the I-League 2nd Division, then second highest level football in India, for two seasons. It currently plays in the GSA Super Division Football League and Youth League. The Gauhati Town Club Football Academy was set up to identify, train and nurture the local talents of northeast India at grassroots level. It has highly equipped infrastructure.

History

1906–2010
Gauhati Town Club is one of the oldest and the premier sporting organizations in the north-east. It was born at the initiative of a dedicated group of sports-lovers including Captain L. B. Scott, I.M.S., who was a civil surgeon, Dr. H.K. Das, an assistant surgeon and founding secretary of the club; Sir Saiyid Saadullah, an eminent lawyer, and Khan Saheb Khalilur Rahman. Significantly, the club was essentially instrumental in introducing the coveted Bordoloi Trophy tournament, initially played at the Judges' Field from 1952 to 1957. Ranji Trophy cricket matches were also played at the same venue.

2010–present
On 21 January 2010, it was announced that Juliano Silveira Fontana, a professional Brazilian football coach, has been appointed as the head coach of the academy. He later coached senior team in the I-League 2nd Division.

In February 2011, it was announced that Gauhati Town Club will participate in 2011 I-League 2nd Division. Team finished season at the bottom of the table and did not gain promotion to the 2011 I-League 2nd Division Final Round. They participated in the 2012 I-League 2nd Division and finished 7th in the group stage.

Players

First-team

GTC Academy team
Gauhati Town Club has its academy team, consisting of youth players. Their U17 also competed in 2022–23 U-17 Youth Cup.

Squad

Management

Honours

League
Assam Club Championship 
Champions (1): 2001
GSA Super Division Football League
Champions (1): 2002

Cup
Bordoloi Trophy
Winners (3): 1954, 1956, 1963
Runners-up (1): 1957

Amba Medhi Football Tournament
Runners-up (2): 2001, 2002

References

External links
 
 
Gauhati Town Club at Soccerway
Gauhati Town Club Football Academy on Facebook
Gauhati Town Club at Global Sports Archive

Multi-sport clubs in India
I-League clubs
Association football clubs established in 1906
Sport in Guwahati
Football clubs in Assam
1906 establishments in India